Spectacle Lake (Nova Scotia) could mean  the following :

Annapolis County

Spectacle Lakes  at

Cape Breton Regional Municipality
Spectacle Lakes at

Municipality of the District of Chester 
Spectacle Lake at 
Spectacle Lakes at

Municipality of Clare

Spectacle Lake at

Municipality of East Hants

Spectacle Lakes at

Halifax Regional Municipality

Spectacle Lake at 
Spectacle Lake at 
Spectacle Lakes at 
Spectacle Lakes at

Kings County
Spectacle Lake at

Region of Queens Municipality

Spectacle Lake at 
Spectacle Lakes at

Lunenburg County
Spectacle Lakes at 
Spectacle Lakes at

Shelburne County

Spectacle Lake at

Yarmouth County
Spectacle Lake at

References
Geographical Names Board of Canada
Explore HRM
Nova Scotia Placenames

Lakes of Nova Scotia
Lakes, Spectacle Lake
Nova Scotia